Hassan Hamid al-Din ibn Yahya (13 June 1908 – 13 June 2003) was a Yemeni royal and statesman who served as the Prime Minister of the Mutawakkilite Kingdom of Yemen, once from April 1948 to August 1955, a second time from 1962 to 1967, and a third time from 1969 to 1970.

Biography 
He was born at Al-Qafla, Hashid. He was the third oldest of king Yahya's fourteen sons. During his father's reign, he was Governor of Ibb Province (1938–1948). After his father's assassination, he supported his older brother Ahmad in becoming King of Yemen. Following a coup attempt by their younger brother Abdullah, he was dismissed as prime minister after being wrongfully suspected of supporting the coup attempt. He was appointed head of North Yemen's delegation to the UN. After the republican coup, he proclaimed himself King and travelled to Saudi Arabia, where he learned that his nephew, King Muhammad, was still alive. He subsequently withdrew his claim to the throne. He was appointed prime minister of the government-in-exile, and served two terms (1962–1967, 1969–1970). He died in Jeddah, Saudi Arabia, on his 95th birthday.

His title was Saif Al-Islam.

Honours 
 Knight Grand Cross of the Order of Merit of the Italian Republic (13 January 1953).

References 

1908 births
2003 deaths
Rassid dynasty
Permanent Representatives of Yemen to the United Nations
Knights Grand Cross of the Order of Merit of the Italian Republic
Sons of kings
20th-century Yemeni politicians
Hamidaddin family